The 130th Pennsylvania Volunteer Infantry was an infantry regiment that served in the Union Army during the American Civil War.

Service
The 130th Pennsylvania Infantry was organized at Harrisburg, Pennsylvania, in August 1862 and mustered in under the command of Colonel Henry I. Zinn.

The regiment was attached to 2nd Brigade, 3rd Division, II Corps, Army of the Potomac.

The 130th Pennsylvania Infantry mustered out May 21, 1863.

Detailed service
Moved to Washington, D.C., August 18, and duty there until September 7. Marched to Rockville, Md., September 7-12. A Maryland Campaign. Battle of Antietam September 16-17. Moved to Harpers Ferry, Va., September 22, and duty there until October 30. Advance up Loudon Valley and movement to Falmouth, Va., October 30-November 19. Battle of Fredericksburg, Va., December 12-15. Duty at Falmouth until April, 1863. Chancellorsville Campaign April 27-May 6. Battle of Chancellorsville May 1-5.

Casualties
The regiment lost a total of 92 men during service; 4 officers and 56 enlisted men killed or mortally wounded, 32 enlisted men died of disease.

Commanders
 Colonel Henry I. Zinn - killed in action at the Battle of Fredericksburg
 Colonel Levi Maish
 Major Joseph S. Jenkins - commanded at the Battle of Chancellorsville after Col. Maish was wounded in action
 Captain William M. Porter - commanded at the Battle of Fredericksburg after the death of Col. Zinn

See also

 List of Pennsylvania Civil War Units
 Pennsylvania in the Civil War

References
 Brehm, Samuel Henry. The Civil War Journal of Samuel Henry Brehm: 130th Regiment of Pennsylvania Volunteers, Newville, Cumberland County, Pennsylvania, August 8, 1862 to May 21, 1863 (Hamilton, Ontario: W. A. Brehm), 2005. 
 Dyer, Frederick H. A Compendium of the War of the Rebellion (Des Moines, IA: Dyer Pub. Co.), 1908.
 Hays, John. The 130 Regiment, Pennsylvania Volunteers in the Maryland Campaign and the Battle of Antietam: An Address Delivered June 7, 1894, Before Capt. Colwell Post 201 G.A.R. (Carlisle, PA: Herald Print. Co.), 1894.
 One Hundred and Thirtieth Regiment Pennsylvania Volunteer Infantry: Ceremonies and Addresses at Dedication of Monument at Bloody Lane, Antietam Battlefield, September 17, 1904 (S.l.: s.n.), 1904.
 Spangler, Edward W. My Little War Experience: With Historical Sketches and Memorabilia (York, PA: York Daily Pub. Co.), 1904.
Attribution

External links
 National flag of the 130th Pennsylvania Infantry
 130th Pennsylvania Infantry monument at Antietam

Military units and formations established in 1862
Military units and formations disestablished in 1863
Units and formations of the Union Army from Pennsylvania